Hold Conversation is the debut EP by the Getaway Plan, released on 13 March 2006.

Tracks from the EP received airplay on Australian national youth radio station Triple J, notably the track "If The Suspense Doesn't Kill Us, Something Else Will..."

This is the last release as a five piece, guitarist/vocalist Benny Chong departed soon after its release.

Track listing
All lyrics written by Matthew Wright, all music composed by the Getaway Plan

Personnel
 Matthew Wright – Lead vocals, piano
 Clint Splattering – Lead guitar
 Benny Chong – Rhythm guitar, backing vocals
 Dave Anderson – Bass guitar
 Aaron Barnett – Drums, percussion

Release history

References

2006 debut EPs
The Getaway Plan albums